Seth Elijah Adkins (born October 30, 1989) is an American actor. He made his debut as a child actor in the TV shows Small Talk and Sabrina, the Teenage Witch in 1996 and the films ...First Do No Harm and Titanic in 1997. He later made a successful transition to portraying adult characters. Adkins played Pinocchio in the film Geppetto (2000) and appeared in the film Let Me In (2010) directed by Matt Reeves.

Personal life
Adkins was born in Albuquerque, New Mexico. He has two elder brothers, Zachary (b. 1978) and Josh (b. 1981). His father is a principal and his mother a former teacher. At an early age and with the support of his parents, Adkins followed his older brother into the acting profession. He graduated in 2008 from the Public Academy for Performing Arts.

Career
Adkins made his debut in 1996, in the shows Small Talk and in Sabrina, the Teenage Witch. He appeared in the series ER, and C-16: FBI, and in the films ...First Do No Harm, Stir, Titanic. He voiced Duby in the film Baby Geniuses. He had a role in the television movie Wuthering Heights, and in the feature films Funky Monkey, Bad News Bears, Privileged, and Let Me In. Adkins also appeared in the television series CSI: Miami and Touched by an Angel, Judging Amy, NCIS: Naval Criminal Investigative Service, and Crash.

Filmography

Film

Television

Video games

External links
 
 
 

1989 births
Living people
20th-century American male actors
21st-century American male actors
Male actors from Albuquerque, New Mexico
American male child actors
American male film actors
American male video game actors